Snakes and Ladders is a Canadian television mini-series created by Wayne Grigsby which aired on CBC Television in 2004. The series starred Amy Price-Francis as Shannon Jennings, a woman who takes a job as an executive assistant at Parliament Hill for a cabinet minister named Audrey Flankman (Catherine Disher). The series was shot in documentary style, and was produced by the same people who produced the series Trudeau.

Cast
 Catherine Disher as Minister Audrey Flankman
 Amy Price-Francis as Shannon Jennings
 Jeremy Akerman as Lamar
 Matthew Ferguson as Donnie Logan
 Marcel Jeannin as Patrick Arthur Lewis

Episodes
 Premiere
 The Bling Bling
 American Pie
 Section 24
 Squattergate
 Sisters

Awards
Snakes and Ladders was nominated for both Writers Guild of Canada and Directors Guild of Canada awards. It was also nominated for 7 Gemini Awards, with Catherine Disher winning best performance by an actress for her role.

External links

2000s Canadian drama television series
2000s Canadian television miniseries
2004 Canadian television series debuts
2004 Canadian television series endings
Canadian political drama television series
CBC Television original programming
Television shows set in Ottawa